Ove Lestander (born 23 July 1940) was a former Swedish cross-country skiing who scored international successes in the late 1960s and early 1970s. He earned a bronze medal in the 4 × 10 km relay at the 1970 FIS Nordic World Ski Championships in Vysoké Tatry.

Cross-country skiing results

World Championships
 1 medal – (1 bronze)

External links
World Championship results 
 Längdskidor Sverige: Svenska OS, VM och EM-medaljörer (Swedish cross-country skiers: Olympic Games, WM and EM medalists), www.sporthistoria.se 

Swedish male cross-country skiers
Living people
FIS Nordic World Ski Championships medalists in cross-country skiing
1941 births